Events from the year 1789 in Denmark.

Incumbents
 Monarch – Christian VII
 Prime minister – Andreas Peter Bernstorff

Events
 9 July – The Theater War, which began the previous year, formally ends.

Undated
 Andreas Hjorth founds what will later become known as Emil Hjorth & Sønner.

Births
 7 February – Joakim Frederik Schouw, lawyer, botanist and politician (died 1852)
 28 May – Bernhard Severin Ingemann, writer (died 1862)
 15 October – William Christopher Zeise, chemist (died 1847)
 30 October – Princess Louise Charlotte, princess of Denmark (died 1864)

Deaths

References

 
1780s in Denmark
Denmark
Years of the 18th century in Denmark